Andrey Mikhaylovich Skoromnyy – (born 30 June 1989, Erki, Cherkassy region, USSR) is a Russian athlete, Master of Sports of Russia on bodybuilding.

Biography 
Andrey Mikhaylovich Skoromnyy was born on 30 June 1989 in Ukraine, Cherkassy region. Andrey spent his childhood and school years in the north of Russia, in the village Purpe of Yamalo-Nenets Autonomous District.

At school Andrey stood out for his love for the sport. In the mornings before the lessons started he regularly used to jog, he also did various sports, and represented his school in different sport events and competitions. Before bodybuilding became his passion, Andrey had already had several senior degrees in such sports as athletics, gymnastics, and basketball.

In 2006, Andrey Skoromnyy graduated from high school and moved to Moscow to study. At the age of 17, Andrey began attending the nearby weightlifting club and became extremely interested in bodybuilding. His initial weight was about 65 kg when he started weight training.

Yoshkar-Ola Championship held in the spring of 2010 became the first bodybuilding competition for Andrey. On it the debutant participated in the junior category and in the final standing confidently took the first place. After that Andrey was asked to compete for bodyweight category for men "up to 90kg". As a result, he won a bronze medal.

At all-Russian tournament on bodybuilding held the same spring, Andrey won in the category "juniors over 75 kg" category and got the first place in absolute junior standing. In the make "up to 90 kg" category Andrey trailed only to Sergei Kopantsev and Vadim Solonchak, who took first and second places respectively.
In autumn 2010, in the championship of Moscow region he got again the first place in absolute standing among the juniors, and again the third place in the category for men, but "up to 100 kg"category. He had the same result in the Moscow city championship (the first place in absolute standing among the juniors). And this time due to leaner muscles Andrey took second place in the "up to 90 kg" category by turning aside a bronze medalist Ivan Kochetkov. He trailed only to Ivan Vodianov.

Andrey Skoromnyy completed autumn contest participating in all-Russian tournament, where he won his category of "juniors over 75 kg" as well as the absolute standings, and became the champion of Russia. Unfortunately, he couldn't compete in the World Championship. A simple cold led to a complicated ear disease. Therefore, 17 days before the announced date Andrey was taken to hospital and was forced to stop precompetitive preparation.

Having missed the spring competitive season, in October 2011 at the Open Championship and Cup of Moscow, after leaving the junior division Andrey Skoromnyy got first place in the category for "men up to 100 kg". In absolute standings he was second after a heavy-weight champion Vitaliy Fateev, having beaten the winners of other weight categories: Sergey Doronichev (up to 85 kg), Pavel Ivanov (up to 90 kg), and Pavel Goncharov (up to 80 kg).
He graduated from Moscow State Automobile and Road University, Faculty of Road Transport. While studying at the university, he worked as a personal trainer in the fitness centre.

On his trainings Andrey Skoromnyy follows his intuition. And in the off-season and before contests he does high-volume workouts, he works with each muscle group once every 7 days. He usually trains either three days on/one day off or two days on/one day off.  He doesn't train the abdominal and calf muscles in the off-season. He does a 20-minute cardiovascular exercise after strength training. While "cutting" he is on the carbohydrate-free diet and compensates the lack of calories with plenty of protein. Andrey trains in Lyubertsy.

In the beginning of a pretty successful competitive career Andrey trained individually. But later he confessed that due to a lack of knowledge of competitive training and he asked for help from Aleksey V. Kireev ("Dr. Luber"). The first results of their fruitful cooperation became the nearest achievements of 2010 autumn season.

Personal life 
Wife Arina Skoromnaya (date of birth 27 March 1988). Arina and Adrey have daughter (born 12 April 2014).

Anthropometric data 
Anthropometric data (measurements)
 height – 174см
 weight:
 contest — 98 kg,
 off season — 118 kg,
 waist — 85 см
 neck — 45 см
 biceps — 55 см,
 thigh — 71 см
 shin — 50 см

Achievements 
Andrey Skoromnyy participated in the following bodybuilding contests:

2010 
Moscow Cup:
 juniors, absolute standing, 1st  place
 for men "up to 90 kg", 3rd  place

Central Federal District Cup:
 juniors, absolute standing, 1st  place
 for men "up to 90 kg", 4th  place

Russian Cup (FBFR):
 juniors over 75 kg, 1st  place
 juniors, absolute standing, 1st place
 for men "up to 90 kg", 3rd  place

Championship of Moscow region:
 juniors, absolute standing, 1st  place
 for men "up to 100 kg", 3rd  place

Moscow Championship:
 juniors, absolute standing, 1st  place
 for men "up to 90 kg", 2nd  place

Russian Championship (FBFR):
 juniors "over 75 kg", 1st  place
 juniors, absolute standing, 1st  place
 for men "up to 90 kg", 5th  place

2011 
Moscow Championship:
 for men "up to 100 kg", 1st  place
 male absolute standing, 2nd  place

2012 
Russian Championship (FBFR):
 for men "up to 100 kg", 2nd  place 

Champions Cup:
 male absolute standing, 5th  place

Grand Prix Fitness House:
 male absolute standing, 4th  place

2013 
Arnold Amateur (IFBB):
 Men up to 100 kg, was not included in the 6 winners (other places are not mentioned in IFBB record)
Russian Championship (FBFR):
 for men "up to 100 kg", 2nd  place.

Notes

Further reading 
Dmitriy Yakovina "Andrey Skoromnyy about hands workout" (rus.) // Железный мир: Journal / Heads. Ed. Dmitriy Yakovina. – M .: "Megabild" LLC, 2013. – No. 4. – P. 60–68. – .

External links 
 skoromnyy.com – Official site of Andrey Skoromnyy.

Russian bodybuilders
1989 births
Living people